A rowlock, sometimes spur (due to the similarity in shape and size), oarlock (American English)  or gate, is a brace that attaches an oar to a boat. When a boat is rowed, the rowlock acts as a fulcrum for the oar.

On ordinary rowing craft, the rowlocks are attached to the gunwales.  In the sport of rowing, the rowlocks are attached to outriggers (often just called "riggers"), which project from the boat and provide greater leverage.  In sport rowing, the rowlocks are normally U-shaped and attached to a vertical pin which allows the rowlock to pivot around the pin during the rowing stroke. They additionally have a locking mechanism  (properly known as "the gate") across the top of the "U" to prevent the oar from unintentionally popping out of the rowlock.

Originally, rowlocks were two wooden posts or thole pins that the shaft of the oar nestled between. Single thole pins may be used when the oars have holes cut into the loom, which then sits over/around the thole pin.

Sport rowing
In sport rowing oarlocks were originally brass or bronze and open (no gate). With the advent of modern materials oarlocks are now injection moulded plastic and precision made to minimize play (slop) between the oar collar and the oarlock. The most recent sport racing oarlocks have a spring loaded feature to keep the oar collar firmly against the pin at all times.

Oarlocks are technical pieces of equipment in sport rowing, holding the oar shaft and therefore the oar blade at the correct angle in the water to ensure optimum performance.

Heraldry

The Norwegian municipalities of Fosnes, Radøy and Tjøme have rowlocks on their coats of arms. A rowlock is also used in the coat of arms of Hailuoto, Finland, to symbolise the maritime economy of the island municipality; the coat of arms is blazoned as "Azure a rowlock argent." A type of rowlock is also featured in the canting arms of Hankasalmi, alluding to the municipality's name (hankain = rowlock, salmi = strait).

References

Rowing equipment
Water sports equipment